Pill prizes are the idea put forth by Joseph E. Stiglitz when he wrote "Prizes, not patents", in order to address shortfalls of using patents from a pharmaceutical drug perspective. Patents are awarded to inventors and firms in order to promote innovation by providing incentives beyond traditional market incentives. Stiglitz is critical of patents and how they fail provide similar incentives to innovations which are not marketable to the normal consumer society while simply restricting information which is inefficient. Stiglitz provides the idea of prizes instead of patents to be awarded in order to further advance pharmaceutical solutions to global problems such as AIDS.

Patents essentially provide a temporary monopoly on a product to the first inventor or firm which comes up with the product. Patents vary in length but are designed to last long enough for the innovator to make a return on investment. The nature of patents makes them an incentive so long as the product being invented is distributed to consumers through markets. While patented products are in the market, the producer can place any price on the product, regardless of the price of production which typically dictates prices in markets. If a product is not being distributed through markets then a patent cannot provide proper incentive for innovation. Patents do however provide gain through the restriction of information to others. Stiglitz identifies this as a problem of patents for the innovation of drugs and other products being distributed not with the purpose of making a profit, but to solve global problems.

Offering a prize as opposed to a patent, according to Stiglitz, would address the lack of incentive for problems such as disease in developing countries and it would provide products immediately affordable instead of pending on a patent expiration. Awarding prizes offers a fixed amount appropriate for reimbursing research into drugs. Today, many drug companies spend much of money earned through patents on marketing and advertising as opposed to the research for the actual drugs 

Until generic versions of drugs reach the shelves, which occurs after a patent expires, the costs burden consumers due to prices not being dictated by the markets. These burdens are overwhelming in developing countries and Stiglitz suggests they be lowered by offering prizes instead of patents. Stiglitz discusses the idea of using foreign aid assistance funds to finance prizes as it would provide greater foreign aid than what funds are being used for currently.

References 

Pharmaceutical industry